The (standard) Boolean model of information retrieval (BIR) is a classical information retrieval (IR) model and, at the same time, the first and most-adopted one. It is used by many IR systems to this day. The BIR is based on Boolean logic and classical set theory in that both the documents to be searched and the user's query are conceived as sets of terms (a bag-of-words model). Retrieval is based on whether or not the documents contain the query terms.

Definitions

An index term is a word or expression, which may be stemmed, describing or characterizing a document,  such as a keyword given for a journal article. Letbe the set of all such index terms.

Letbe the set of all documents.

A query is a Boolean expression  in normal form:where  is true for  when . (Equivalently,  could be expressed in  disjunctive normal form.)

We seek to find the set of documents that satisfy .  This operation is called retrieval and consists of the following two steps:

 1. Then the set of documents that satisfy Q is given by:

Example

Let the set of original (real) documents be, for example

 

where

 = "Bayes' principle: The principle that, in estimating a parameter, one should initially assume that each possible value has equal probability (a uniform prior  distribution)."

 = "Bayesian decision theory: A mathematical theory of decision-making which presumes utility and probability functions, and according to which the act to be chosen is the Bayes act, i.e. the one with highest subjective expected utility. If one had unlimited time and calculating power with which to make every decision, this procedure would be the best way to make any decision."

 = "Bayesian epistemology: A philosophical theory which holds that the epistemic status of a proposition (i.e. how well proven or well established it is) is best measured by a probability and that the proper way to revise this probability is given by Bayesian conditionalisation or similar procedures. A Bayesian epistemologist would use probability to define, and explore the relationship between, concepts such as epistemic status, support or explanatory power."

Let the set  of terms be:

Then, the set  of documents is as follows:

 

where 

Let the query  be:

Then to retrieve the relevant documents:
 Finally, the following documents  are retrieved in response to  

Obviously, if there is more than one document with the same representation, every such document is retrieved. Such documents are indistinguishable in the BIR (in other words, equivalent).

Advantages 

 Clean formalism
 Easy to implement
 Intuitive concept
 If the resulting document set is either too small or too big, it is directly clear which operators will produce respectively a bigger or smaller set.
It gives (expert) users a sense of control over the system. It is immediately clear why a document has been retrieved given a query.

Disadvantages 

 Exact matching may retrieve too few or too many documents
 Hard to translate a query into a Boolean expression
 All terms are equally weighted
 More like data retrieval than information retrieval
 Retrieval based on binary decision criteria with no notion of partial matching
 No ranking of the documents is provided (absence of a grading scale)
 Information need has to be translated into a Boolean expression, which most users find awkward
 The Boolean queries formulated by the users are most often too simplistic
 The model frequently returns either too few or too many documents in response to a user query

Data structures and algorithms 

From a pure formal mathematical point of view, the BIR is straightforward. From a practical point of view, however, several further problems should be solved that relate to algorithms and data structures, such as, for example, the choice of terms (manual or automatic selection or both), stemming, hash tables, inverted file structure, and so on.

Hash sets 

Another possibility is to use hash sets. Each document is represented by a hash table which contains every single term of that document. Since hash table size increases and decreases in real time with the addition and removal of terms, each document will occupy much less space in memory. However, it will have a slowdown in performance because the operations are more complex than with bit vectors. On the worst-case performance can degrade from O(n) to O(n2). On the average case, the performance slowdown will not be that much worse than bit vectors and the space usage is much more efficient.

Signature file 
Each document can be summarized by Bloom filter representing the set of words in that document, stored in a fixed-length bitstring, called a signature.
The signature file contains one such superimposed code bitstring for every document in the collection.
Each query can also be summarized by a Bloom filter representing the set of words in the query, stored in a bitstring of the same fixed length.
The query bitstring is tested against each signature.

The signature file approached is used in BitFunnel.

Inverted file 

An inverted index file contains two parts:
a vocabulary containing all the terms used in the collection,
and for each distinct term an inverted index that lists every document that mentions that term.

References 

 

Mathematical modeling
Information retrieval techniques